Illite is a group of closely related non-expanding clay minerals. Illite is a secondary mineral precipitate, and an example of a phyllosilicate, or layered alumino-silicate. Its structure is a 2:1 sandwich of silica tetrahedron (T) – alumina octahedron (O) – silica tetrahedron (T) layers. The space between this T-O-T sequence of layers is occupied by poorly hydrated potassium cations which are responsible for the absence of swelling. Structurally, illite is quite similar to muscovite with slightly more silicon, magnesium, iron, and water and slightly less tetrahedral aluminium and interlayer potassium. It occurs as aggregates of small monoclinic grey to white crystals. Due to the small size, positive identification usually requires x-ray diffraction or SEM-EDS (automated mineralogy) analysis. Illite occurs as an altered product of muscovite and feldspar in weathering and hydrothermal environments; it may be a component of sericite. It is common in sediments, soils, and argillaceous sedimentary rocks as well as in some low grade metamorphic rocks. The iron-rich member of the illite group, glauconite, in sediments can be differentiated by x-ray analysis.

The cation-exchange capacity (CEC) of illite is smaller than that of smectite but higher than that of kaolinite, typically around 20 – 30 meq/100 g. 

Illite was first described for occurrences in the Maquoketa shale in Calhoun County, Illinois, US, in 1937. The name was derived from its type location in Illinois.

Illite is also called hydromica or hydromuscovite. Brammallite is a sodium rich analogue. Avalite is a chromium bearing variety which has been described form Mt. Avala, Belgrade, Serbia.

Illite crystallinity

The crystallinity of illite has been used as an indicator of metamorphic grade in clay-bearing rocks metamorphosed under conditions between diagenesis and low-grade metamorphism. With increasing temperature, illite is thought to undergo a transformation into muscovite.

References

External links

Clay minerals group
Potassium minerals
Aluminium minerals
Aluminosilicates
Magnesium minerals
Mica group
Medicinal clay
Monoclinic minerals
Minerals in space group 12